Mediatization or mediatisation may refer to:

 German mediatisation, German historical territorial restructuring
 Mediatization (media), the influence and interaction of mass media with other sectors of society